Patterson Creek is a creek in West Virginia.

Patterson Creek may also refer to:
Patterson Creek (Iowa), a stream in Iowa
Patterson Creek (Buffalo Creek), a stream in Missouri and Oklahoma
Patterson Creek (Deep River tributary), a stream in Lee County, North Carolina
Patterson Creek, West Virginia, an unincorporated community
Patterson Creek (Ottawa), a stream in Ottawa, Canada
Patterson Creek (Lake Erie), a watershed administered by the Long Point Region Conservation Authority, that drains into Lake Erie